Alpha Pyxidis, Latinised from α Pyxidis, is a giant star in the constellation Pyxis. It has a stellar classification of B1.5III and is a Beta Cephei variable. This star has more than ten times the mass of the Sun and is more than six times the Sun's radius. Stars such as this with more than 10 solar masses are expected to end their life by exploding as a supernova.

Naming

References

External links

B-type giants
Beta Cephei variables
Pyxis (constellation)
Pyxidis, Alpha
PD-32 02399
074575
042828
3468